The Westin Portland Harborview is a historic hotel in Portland, Maine, United States.

History
The hotel was developed by the Rines family, Portland businessmen who owned Rines Brothers, a major local department store. It was designed by Portland architect Herbert W. Rhodes  and opened in 1927 as The Eastland, the largest hotel in New England. Aviator Charles Lindbergh stayed at The Eastland after returning from his historic solo non-stop flight across the Atlantic Ocean. In 1946, the hotel gained attention when it refused to allow former First Lady Eleanor Roosevelt to stay with her dog, Fala, for the night. She instead stayed at the Royal River Cabins in Yarmouth.

In 1961, The Eastland was bought by the Dunfey family. In 1965, they made it a Sheraton Hotels franchise operation, and it was renamed the Sheraton-Eastland Motor Hotel. The hotel left Sheraton in 1974 and became the Eastland Motor Hotel. It was sold in 1980 and in 1983 was renamed the Sonesta Portland Hotel. It left Sonesta in January 1995 and was briefly renamed the Eastland Plaza Hotel, only to become the Radisson Eastland Hotel Portland six months later, in July 1995. Following a 1997 sale of the property, the hotel left Radisson in December 1999 amid legal disputes and was renamed the Eastland Hotel. Following a foreclosure sale in 2000, its name was modified slightly to the Eastland Park Hotel. It kept that name through a 2004 renovation until it closed in 2011. The hotel was completely gutted and rebuilt as a modern business hotel and reopened as The Westin Portland Harborview on December 12, 2013.

Gallery

See also
 List of Historic Hotels of America

References

External links
Official site

Hotels in Portland, Maine
Hotels established in 1927
Hotel buildings completed in 1927
1927 establishments in Maine